Illya Solomin (born 7 May 1998) is a Swedish retired figure skater. He is a three-time Swedish national silver medalist and a two-time (2014–15) national junior champion. He reached the free skate at the 2014 World Junior Championships.

Personal life 
Solomin was born on 7 May 1998 in Kyiv, Ukraine. He moved to Sweden when he was five and a half years old. He has two sisters, Anna and Alesandra.

Career

Early years 
Solomin began learning to skate in 2005. He competed on the novice level until the end of the 2012–13 season.

2013–14 season 
Solomin made his junior international debut in October 2013, placing 14th at the ISU Junior Grand Prix (JGP) event in Tallinn, Estonia, and went on to win the Swedish national junior title. He first competed on the senior international level in January 2014, at the European Championships in Budapest, Hungary, but was eliminated after placing 34th in the short program. He reached the final segment at the 2014 World Junior Championships in Sofia, Bulgaria, placing 23rd in the short program, 22nd in the free skate, and 22nd overall.

2014–15 season 
Solomin competed in two stages of the 2014–15 JGP series, placing 12th in Aichi, Japan, and 11th in Zagreb, Croatia. Competing on the junior level, he won gold at the NRW Trophy and repeated as the Swedish junior champion, before taking bronze at the Toruń Cup. He withdrew from the 2015 World Junior Championships in Tallinn before the start of the event.

2015–16 season 
In the 2015–16 season, Solomin won the junior silver medal at the Lombardia Trophy and finished tenth at his sole 2015 JGP event, in Zagreb. Competing on the senior level, he took the silver medal at the Swedish Championship, behind Ondrej Spiegl. Solomin was assigned to the 2016 World Junior Championships in Debrecen, Hungary, but withdrew before the start of the competition.

Retirement 
Skate Sweden announced Solomin's retirement in their beginning of the 2021-22 season team update post.

Programs

Competitive highlights 
CS: Challenger Series; JGP: Junior Grand Prix

References

External links 
 

1998 births
Swedish male single skaters
Living people
People from Solna Municipality
Ukrainian emigrants to Sweden